Meswak (also referred to as Miswak) is a fluoride-free toothpaste brand that was launched in India by Balsara Hygiene in 1998. The toothpaste is marketed as a herbal toothpaste as it is made from extracts of the Salvadora persica plant. The teeth cleaning twig of the plant is reputed to have been used over 7,000 years ago. 

The brand was relatively unknown until a television advertising campaign during the 1998 Coca-Cola Cup spread brand awareness. In 2005, Meswak was sold by Balsara to Dabur along with other Balsara toothpaste brands Babool and Promise in a  deal. In 2011, Dabur announced that Bipasha Basu would be Meswak's brand ambassador.

See also

List of toothpaste brands
Index of oral health and dental articles

References

External links
 Meswak Official website

Brands of toothpaste
Oral hygiene
Indian brands